Elendil is a fictional character in J. R. R. Tolkien's legendarium. He is mentioned in The Lord of the Rings, The Silmarillion and Unfinished Tales. He was the father of Isildur and Anárion, last lord of Andúnië on the island of Númenor, and having escaped its downfall by sailing to Middle-earth, became the first High King of Arnor and Gondor. In the Last Alliance of Men and Elves, Elendil and Gil-galad laid siege to the Dark Lord Sauron's fortress of Barad-dûr, and fought him hand-to-hand for the One Ring. Both Elendil and Gil-galad were killed, and Elendil's son Isildur took the Ring for himself.

Tolkien called Elendil a "Noachian figure", an echo of the biblical Noah.  Elendil escaped from the flood that drowned Númenor, itself an echo of the myth of Atlantis, founding new Númenórean kingdoms in Middle-earth.

Fictional history

Biography 

Elendil was born in Númenor, son of Amandil, Lord of Andúnië and leader of the "Faithful" (those who remained loyal to the Valar), who maintained a strong friendship with the Elves and preserved the old ways against the practices of king Ar-Pharazôn and Sauron. His father Amandil had been a great admiral of the Númenórean fleet and a close friend to Ar-Pharazôn in their youth, but as Sauron's influence grew, he resorted to doing what their ancestor Eärendil had done: sailing to Valinor and asking for the pardon of the Valar. Amandil was never heard of again, but on his urging, Elendil, his sons Isildur and Anárion, and their supporters fled the downfall of Númenor at the end of the Second Age, escaping to Middle-earth in nine ships. Elendil landed in Lindon, where he was befriended by Gil-galad, the Elven King. The waves carried Isildur and Anárion south to the Bay of Belfalas and the mouth of the River Anduin. With them the leaders took the palantíri, the "Seeing Stones" that were given to the Lords of Andúnië by the Elves of Tol Eressëa, and a seedling of Nimloth, the White Tree of Númenor.

Unfinished Tales states that, upon landing in Middle-earth, Elendil proclaimed in Quenya:  "Out of the Great Sea to Middle-earth I am come. In this place will I abide, and my heirs, unto the ending of the world." His heir and 40th generation descendant in father-to-son line Aragorn spoke these traditional words again when he took up the crown of Gondor in The Return of the King.

Elendil founded the northern realm of Arnor and its capital city of Annúminas. His sons founded the southern realm of Gondor; Anárion founded the city of Minas Anor (later Minas Tirith) in Anórien, and Isildur founded Minas Ithil (later Minas Morgul) in Ithilien. Elendil was the High King, ruling directly over Arnor and indirectly over Gondor, via its King.

As explained in The Fellowship of the Ring, Sauron eventually returned to Middle-earth, establishing a stronghold in Mordor, which was next to Gondor. He attacked, seizing Minas Ithil. Isildur fled north to his father, leaving Anárion in charge of Gondor. Elendil and Isildur returned south, together with Gil-galad and their combined armies, in the Last Alliance of Elves and Men. They defeated Sauron in the Battle of Dagorlad, and laid siege to his stronghold of Barad-dûr. During this long siege Anárion was killed. Finally, Sauron came out personally to do battle. Gil-galad and Elendil fought him, but both were killed, and Elendil's sword was broken beneath him. Isildur used his father's broken sword to cut the One Ring from Sauron's hand.

Line of the Half-elven

Reception

Biblical echoes 

Nicholas Birns, a scholar of literature, notes Elendil's survival of Númenor's fall, an event that recalls to him both Plato's Atlantis and the Biblical fall of man; he notes that Tolkien called Elendil a "Noachian figure", an echo of the biblical Noah. Tolkien explains that Elendil "held off" from the Númenórean rebellion, and had kept ships ready; he "flees before the overwhelming storm of the wrath of the West [from Valinor], and is borne high upon the towering waves that bring ruin to the west of the Middle-earth." Birns notes that Elendil, who he calls a hugely important figure in Middle-earth, must be later "in comparative time" than Noah; where Noah was a refugee, Elendil was "an imperialist, a founder of realms". However, he grants that "Noachian" implies a class of people like Noah, and the possibility of different kinds of flood. Birns comments that Middle-earth has its Creation and Flood myths, but not exactly a fall of man. He suggests that Tolkien, as a Catholic, may have been more comfortable working with the forces of nature seen in Creation and Flood, but preferred to leave the fall alone; he notes that both Creation and Flood are found in non-Christian tales from the Middle East, citing the Epic of Gilgamesh for the Flood and the Enuma Elish for Creation.

The priest and Tolkien scholar Fleming Rutledge writes that Aragorn, narrating the Lay of Beren and Lúthien to the hobbits, tells them that Lúthien's line "shall never fail". Rutledge talks of the "kings of Númenor, that is Westernesse", and as they gaze at him, they see that the moon "climbs behind him as if to crown him", which Rutledge calls an echo of the Transfiguration. Rutledge explains that Aragorn is of the line of Elendil and knows he will inherit "the crown of Elendil and the other Kings of vanished Númenor", just as Jesus is of the line of King David, fulfilling the prophecy that the line of Kings would not fail.

Zak Cramer notes in Mallorn that Tolkien's middle name, Reuel, means "God's friend", and could be written "El's friend" with reference to the Hebrew word for "God". He speculates that Elendil, "Elf-friend", may have been a wordplay on this name.

Classical echoes 

The classical scholar J. K. Newman compares the myth of Elendil and the defeat of Sauron with Jason's taking of the Golden Fleece. In both, a golden prize is taken; in both, there are evil consequences – Elendil's son Isildur is betrayed and the Ring is lost, leading to the War of the Ring and Frodo's quest; Medea murders Jason's children.

Germanic echoes 

Tolkien wrote in a 1964 letter that the story of Elendil began when C. S. Lewis and he agreed to write a space travel and a time travel story, respectively. Tolkien's tale was to be called Númenor, the Land in the West, with repeated father–son pairs whose names meant "Bliss-friend" and "Elf-friend" each time. It was not completed, but survives as two unfinished time-travel novels, The Lost Road and The Notion Club Papers. The Elf-friends were to be Elwin in present time; Ælfwine (Old English) around 918 AD; Alboin from "Lombardic legend"; and eventually Elendil of Númenor. Tolkien states that he lost interest in the others, and focussed on Elendil, whose story he incorporated into his "main mythology". One of Tolkien's correspondents, the scholar of English, Rhona Beare, writes in Mythlore that Elendil is a "remote ancestor" of Alboin; when Alboin travels back in time he finds Númenor simultaneously familiar and strange, because he can see it both with Elendil's eyes and with his own.

Adaptations 

In Peter Jackson's The Lord of the Rings: The Fellowship of the Ring, Elendil is portrayed by Peter McKenzie. He appears briefly in the prologue, where he is killed by Sauron. The action differs from the book, where Gil-galad and Elendil heroically defeated Sauron, at the cost of their own lives, allowing Isildur to take the Ring without difficulty. In the film, Sauron defeats Elendil, and Isildur fights Sauron, the action of cutting off his finger and the Ring serving to vanquish Sauron. Tolkien instructed that "Sauron should not be thought of as very terrible. The form that he took was that of a more than human stature, but not gigantic", though he "could appear as a commanding figure of great strength of body and supremely royal demeanor and countenance." Jackson chooses to make Sauron much larger than Elendil for his final battle. The scholar of English literature Robert Tally comments that it is ironic that Jackson may have come closest to Tolkien's intentions in the prologue by representing Sauron in humanoid form, while he is a disembodied eye everywhere else in the film series.

In the 2022 television series, The Lord of the Rings: The Rings of Power, Elendil is played by Lloyd Owen. The show introduces Elendil as a Númenórean nobleman, who serves as a sea captain. He is a widower with three adult children: sons Isildur and Anárion, and a daughter Eärien.

See also 

 Dúnedain

References

Primary 
This list identifies each item's location in Tolkien's writings.

Secondary

Sources 

 
 
 
 
 
 
 
 

Fictional kings
Fictional swordfighters
Literary characters introduced in 1954
Middle-earth Dúnedain
Middle-earth rulers
The Lord of the Rings characters